The North Midlands Vase is an annual rugby union knock-out club competition organized by the North Midlands Rugby Football Union and was first contested during the 2005-06 season when Kings Norton became the first winners when they defeated Oswestry in the final at Stourton Park in Stourbridge.  The vase is currently open for clubs ranked in tiers 9-10 of the English rugby union system that fall under the North Midlands RFU umbrella, including sides based in Birmingham and the West Midlands, Herefordshire, Shropshire and Worcestershire, although one club, Dudley Wasps plays in the Midlands Reserve League, and two others, Bredon Star and Ross Wye, are both based in Gloucestershire and play in Gloucester 1 and Gloucester 2 respectively (tiers 9-10).  In 2014 the North Midlands RFU introduced a 'Plate' competition for sides eliminated in the early stages of the vase.  It is one of three men's club competitions in the region along with the North Midlands Cup (for tier 5-6 sides) and the North Midlands Shield (for tier 7-8 sides).

The current format is as a knock-out cup with a preliminary round, first round, quarter-final, semi-final and final which is held at a neutral venue in May (currently Heathbrook, home of Dudley Kingswinford RFC) along with the cup and shield finals.  Due to the disjointed numbers of teams several teams have play in the preliminary round.  Teams that lose in either the preliminary or first round stage then contest the plate while winners go on to contest the cup proper.

North Midlands Vase winners

Number of wins

Vase
Ross on Wye (4)
Bredon Star (2)
Evesham (2)
Kings Norton (2)
Dudley Wasps (1)
Edwardian (1)
Old Yardleians (1)

Plate
Aldridge (1)
Church Streeton (1)
Redditch (1)
Yardley & District (1)

Notes

See also
 North Midlands RFU
 North Midlands Cup
 North Midlands Shield
 English rugby union system
 Rugby union in England

References

External links
 North Midlands RFU

Recurring sporting events established in 1972
Rugby union cup competitions in England